Taljhari is a village in the Jarmundi CD block in the Dumka Sadar subdivision of the Dumka district in the Indian state of Jharkhand.

Geography

Location

Area

Overview
The map shows a large area, which is a plateau with low hills, except in the eastern portion where the Rajmahal hills intrude into this area and the Ramgarh hills are there. The south-western portion is just a rolling upland. The entire area is overwhelmingly rural with only small pockets of urbanisation.

Note: The full screen map is interesting. All places marked on the map are linked in the full screen map and one can easily move on to another page of his/her choice. Enlarge the full screen map to see what else is there – one gets railway connections, many more road connections and so on.

Demographics
According to the 2011 Census of India, Taljhari had a total population of 342, of which 188 (55%) were males and 154 (45%) were females. Population in the age range 0–6 years was 38. The total number of literate persons in Taljhari was 304 (70.72% of the population over 6 years).

Civic administration

Police station
There is a police station at Taljhari.

Transport
Ghormara railway station,  on the Jasidih-Dumka-Rampurhat line, is located nearby.

Education
Government High School Taljhari is a Hindi-medium coeducational institution established in 1911. It has facilities for teaching from class I to class X.

References

Villages in Dumka district